Musharraf, Mosharraf, Mosharrof, Musharrif or Mosharafa is a given name and surname of Arabic origin.

Notable people with the name include:

Given name
 Musharrif al-Dawla (1003–1025), Buyid amir of Iraq 
 Musharraf Al-Ruwaili (born 1985), Saudi football player
 Musharraf Ali Farooqi, Pakistani-Canadian writer
 Mosharraf Hossain (disambiguation) – several people
 Mosharraf Karim, Bangladeshi actor
 Musharaff Moulamia Khan, Sufi musician
 Mosharraf Zaidi, Pakistani columnist and journalist

Surname
 Ali Moustafa Mosharafa (1898–1950), Egyptian theoretical physicist
 Khaled Mosharraf, Bangladeshi military officer
 Pervez Musharraf (1943-2023), former President of Pakistan
 Raja Musharraf, a fictional Pakistani exchange student character in the American television series Aliens in America